The men's welterweight (67 kg/147.4 lbs) Thai-Boxing division at the W.A.K.O. European Championships 2006 in Skopje was the sixth lightest of the male Thai-Boxing tournaments and was the largest in terms of participants involving thirteen fighters.  Each of the matches was three rounds of two minutes each and were fought under Thai-Boxing rules.

Due to the fact there were not enough competitors for a tournament designed for sixteen, three of the men had byes into the quarter finals.  The tournament gold medal went to rising amateur Muay Thai star Vitaly Gurkov of Belarus who defeated Nikolay Bubnov of Russia by unanimous decision in the final to claim gold.  Defeated semi finalists Mikhail Mishin from Russia and Nebojsa Denic from Serbia won bronze.

Results

Key

See also
List of WAKO Amateur European Championships
List of WAKO Amateur World Championships
List of male kickboxers

References

External links
 WAKO World Association of Kickboxing Organizations Official Site

W.A.K.O. European Championships 2006 (Skopje)